The Division of Barrier was an Australian electoral division in the state of New South Wales. The division was proclaimed in 1900, and was one of the original 65 divisions to be contested at the first federal election. It was named for the Barrier Ranges near the city of Broken Hill in western New South Wales. In 1901, it included Broken Hill, Wilcannia, White Cliffs and Tibooburra and the surrounding pastoral areas. In 1906, it gained Menindee, Wentworth from Riverina and in 1913, it gained Balranald and Deniliquin from Riverina. It was abolished in 1922 with Broken Hill, Wentworth and Balranald being transferred to Darling and Deniliquin transferred to Riverina. It was a very safe seat for the Australian Labor Party, although both its members left the ALP at the end their terms: Josiah Thomas to join the Nationalists, and Michael Considine (a radical socialist) to sit as an independent.

Members

Election results

References

1901 establishments in Australia
Constituencies established in 1901
Barrier